FC Ostrovets is a Belarusian football club based in Ostrovets, Grodno Oblast.

History
FC Ostrovets founded in 2019 and joined Grodno Oblast league the same year. In 2020 FC Ostrovets joined Belarusian Second League.

Current squad
As of March 2023

References

External links
Profile at footballfacts.ru

Association football clubs established in 2019
Football clubs in Belarus
Grodno Region